Song Study EP is an extended play album released by American new wave band Devo on April 20, 2010. It features the same track listing and cover art as the 12" single of "Fresh," with the addition of the Song Study Video.

Track listing
"Fresh" – 2:59
"What We Do" – 3:17
"Song Study Video" – 2:03

References

Devo EPs
2010 EPs
Warner Records EPs